
Calculation in kind or calculation in-natura is a way of valuating resources and a system of accounting that uses disaggregated physical magnitudes as opposed to a common unit of calculation. As the basis for a socialist economy, it was proposed to replace money and financial calculation. Calculation in kind would value each commodity based on its utility, for purposes of economic accounting. By contrast, in money-based economies, a commodity's value includes an exchange value.

Calculation in kind would quantify the utility of an object directly without recourse to a general unit of calculation. This differs from other proposed methods of socialist calculation, such as Taylor-Lange accounting prices, and the use of labor time as a measure of cost.

Calculation in kind was strongly advocated by the positivist philosopher and political economist Otto Neurath when employed by the Bavarian Soviet Republic. This led to a discussion in the early 1920s, in which much of the discussion about socialism centered on whether economic planning should be based on physical quantities or monetary accounting. Neurath was the most forceful advocate of physical planning (economic planning using calculation-in-kind) in contrast to market socialist neoclassical economists who advocated use of notional prices computed by solving simultaneous equations. Austrian school critics of socialism, particularly Ludwig von Mises, based his critique of socialism on the calculation problem.

The most prolific modern proponent of calculation in kind is the Scottish computer scientist Paul Cockshott who differs from Neurath in that he advocates the use of labour vouchers to set a scalar restraint on consumption.

Proponents of in-kind calculation argue that the use of a common medium like money distorts information about the utility of an object. Socialists in favor of calculation in kind argued that, in a system of in-kind calculation, waste associated with the monetary system would be eliminated, and in particular objects would no longer be desired for functionally useless purposes like resale and speculation – they would only be desired for their use-value.

See also

References

Further reading
 Cockshott, Paul. "Calculation in-Natura, from Neurath to Kantorovich" University of Glasgow, 15 May 2008.
 O'Neil, John (2002). "Socialist Calculation and Environmental Valuation: Money, Markets and Ecology". Science and Society 66. 1: 137-158.

External links
 World Socialist Party (US) (the wspus.org quoted above)
 An Anarchist FAQ, I.4.5, "What about supply and demand?"

Socialism
Socialist calculation
Economic planning
Theory of value (economics)
Schools of economic thought